Tracy Arnold (born August 11, 1962) is an American actress.

Arnold was born in Austin, Texas. She is perhaps best known for her role in Henry: Portrait of a Serial Killer (1986), for which she was nominated for Best Supporting Actress by the Independent Spirit Awards.

Her other films include The Borrower (1991), The Shot (1996) and The Other One (2017). She also had a role in an episode of Baywatch.

Filmography
 1986 Henry: Portrait of a Serial Killer as Becky
 1991 The Borrower as Nurse
 1992 Baywatch as Mom (Reunion)
 1993 Sex, Love and Cold Hard Cash as Purser
 1996 The Shot as Sissy Mayron
 2003 The Prince of Peace as Ann
 2017 The Other One as Connie

References

External links

1962 births
Actresses from Texas
American film actresses
American television actresses
Living people
21st-century American women